Burkina Faso (formerly Upper Volta) is a landlocked Sahel country that shares borders with six nations. It lies between the Sahara desert and the Gulf of Guinea, south of the loop of the Niger River, mostly between latitudes 9° and 15°N (a small area is north of 15°), and longitudes 6°W and 3°E. The land is green in the south, with forests and fruit trees, and semi-arid in the north. Burkina Faso's game preserves – the most important of which are Arly, Nazinga, and W National Park—contain lions, elephants, hippopotamus, monkeys, common warthogs, and antelopes. Previously the endangered painted hunting dog, Lycaon pictus occurred in Burkina Faso, but, although the last sightings were made in Arli National Park, the species is considered extirpated from Burkina Faso.

Area
Comparatively, it is slightly larger than New Zealand and Colorado. Its borders total : Benin , Ivory Coast , Ghana , Mali , Niger , and Togo . It has no coastline or maritime claims.

Extreme points 
This is a list of the extreme points of Burkina Faso, the points that are farther north, south, east or west than any other location.

 Northernmost point – unnamed location on the border with Mali, Sahel Region
 Easternmost point – unnamed location on the border with Benin immediately south of the Burkina Faso-Benin-Niger tripoint, Est Region
 Southernmost point – unnamed location on the border with Ivory Coast immediately south of the village of Kpuere, Sud-Ouest Region
 Westernmost point – the tripoint with Mali and Ivory Coast, Cascades Region

Terrain
It is made up of two major types of countryside. The larger part of the country is covered by a peneplain, which forms a gently undulating landscape with, in some areas, a few isolated hills, the last vestiges of a Precambrian massif. Burkina Faso is therefore a relatively flat country. Its elevation extremes are a lowest point at the Mouhoun (Black Volta) River and highest point at Tena Kourou.

Administrative divisions

The country is divided into 13 administrative regions. These regions encompass 45 provinces and 351 departments.

Hydrography
The country owes its former name of Upper Volta to three rivers which cross it: the Black Volta (or Mouhoun), the White Volta (Nakambé) and the Red Volta (Nazinon). The Black Volta is one of the country's only two rivers which flow year-round, the other being the Komoé, which flows to the southwest. The basin of the Niger River also drains 27% of the country's surface.

The Niger's tributaries – the Béli, the Gorouol, the Goudébo and the Dargol – are seasonal streams and flow for only four to six months a year. They still, however, can cause large floods. The country also contains numerous lakes – the principal ones are Tingrela, Bam and Dem. The country contains large ponds, as well, such as Oursi, Béli, Yomboli and Markoye. Water shortages are often a problem, especially in the north of the country.

Climate

Burkina Faso has a primarily tropical climate with two very distinct seasons. In the rainy season, the country receives between 600 and 900 millimetres (23.6 and 35.4 in) of rainfall; in the dry season, the harmattan – a hot dry wind from the Sahara – blows. The rainy season lasts approximately four months, May/June to September, and is shorter in the north of the country. Three climatic zones can be defined: the Sahel, the Sudan-Sahel, and the Sudan-Guinea.

A relatively dry tropical savanna, the Sahel extends beyond the borders of Burkina Faso, from the Horn of Africa to the Atlantic Ocean, and borders the Sahara to its north and the fertile region of the Sudan to the South. Situated between 11°3' and 13°5' north latitude, the Sudan-Sahel region is a transitional zone with regards to rainfall and temperature.

Resources and environment
Burkina Faso's natural resources include manganese, limestone, marble, phosphates, pumice, salt and small deposits of gold. 21.93% of its land is arable, and 0.26% has permanent crops as of 2012. As of 2003, 250 km2 were irrigated. Its total renewable water resources as of 2011 were 12.5 m3, with a total freshwater withdrawal of 0.72 km3/yr (46% domestic, 3% industrial, 51% agricultural; this amounts to a per-capita withdrawal of 54.99 m3/yr.

Burkina Faso's fauna and flora are protected in two national parks and several reserves: see List of national parks in Africa, Nature reserves of Burkina Faso.

Recurring droughts and floods are a significant natural hazard. Current environmental issues include: recent droughts and desertification severely affecting agricultural activities, population distribution, and the economy; overgrazing; soil degradation; deforestation.

Burkina Faso is party to the following international environmental agreements: Biodiversity, Climate Change, Desertification, Endangered Species, Hazardous Wastes, Marine Life Conservation, Ozone Layer Protection, Wetlands. It has signed, but not ratified, the Law of the Sea and the Nuclear Test Ban.

See also
2010 Sahel famine
:Category:Treaties of Burkina Faso

Notes

Line note references

External links
 Soil Maps of Burkina Faso European Digital Archive on the Soil Maps of the world